Joan Brickhill (6 March 1924 – 15 January 2014) was a South African actress who worked in radio, theatre, film, and television. Together with her husband, Louis Burke, she founded Brickhill-Burke Productions, which produced Meet Me in St. Louis on Broadway in 1990 and received four Tony Award nominations, including Best Choreography for Brickhill.

Career
Brickhill was a child prodigy, making her stage debut at two. She later worked as a drama teacher. Her first feature film was Nor the Moon by Night (1958), in which she played the leading role, Harriet Carver. Follow That Rainbow (1979) was her second feature film. She directed and presented, with her husband, Louis Burke, the first South African play in KwaZulu-Natal to be performed for multiracial audiences. She also worked as an executive entertainment producer at Sun City.

Death
Joan Brickhill died at age 89 in Johannesburg on 15 January 2014 from undisclosed causes.

References

External links
 
 
 Joan Brickhill at Who's Who Southern Africa

1924 births
South African film actresses
South African television actresses
South African radio actresses
South African stage actresses
South African theatre managers and producers
White South African people
Actors from Durban
2014 deaths
South African expatriates in the United States